Jimmy Connors and Ilie Năstase were the defending champions, but Riessen did not participate this year.  Okker partnered Arthur Ashe, losing in the quarterfinals.

Tom Okker and Marty Riessen won the title, defeating Bob Hewitt and Frew McMillan 2–6, 6–3, 6–4 in the final.

Seeds

Draw

Finals

Top half

Bottom half

References
Draw

Stockholm Open
1974 Grand Prix (tennis)